Luciano Ciancola (22 October 1929 – 25 July 2011) was an Italian road cyclist. As an amateur he won the 1950 Giro di Campania and the road race at the 1952 World Championships. Between 1952 and 1960 he rode professionally and placed second in the Giro della Sicilia in 1956.

References

1929 births
2011 deaths
Italian male cyclists
Cyclists from Rome